Oleh Okhrimenko (born 24 July 1993) is a Ukrainian footballer who plays as a midfielder.

Career
Okhrimenko started his career in the young academy of Yunist Chernihiv in 2010. In 2012 he moved to Polissya Dobryanka, where played 16 matches and scored 2 goals. In 2013 he moved to Nizhyn and Frunzenets Nizhyn. In 2015 he moved to YSB Chernihiv in the city of Chernihiv where he played 9 matches and in 2016 he played 17 matches with Yednist Plysky scoring 4 goals. In 2017 he moved Polissya Zhytomyr in Ukrainian Second League, where he played 13 goals. He played his first match with the new club against Lviv. In 2020 he moved to Narew Ostrołęka in Poland.

References

External links
 Oleh Okhrimenko at pfl.ua 

 
1993 births
Living people
Footballers from Nizhyn
Ukrainian footballers
Association football forwards
FC Yunist Chernihiv players
FC Chernihiv players
FC Yednist Plysky players
FC Polissya Zhytomyr players
Expatriate footballers in Poland
Ukrainian expatriate sportspeople in Poland
Ukrainian Second League players